St Ailbe's Church is a Catholic church in Emly County Tipperary, Ireland, dedicated to Ailbe of Emly (d. 529). Built in the 1880s, it replaced an 1809 church. The sandstone font at the entrance is believed to be medieval, and the nearby graveyard features St Ailbe's Cross, reputedly the saint's tombstone.

References

External links
Parish website

Roman Catholic churches completed in 1882
Roman Catholic churches in County Tipperary
Roman Catholic Archdiocese of Cashel and Emly
19th-century Roman Catholic church buildings in Ireland
19th-century churches in the Republic of Ireland